San Pablo District is one of four districts of the province San Pablo in Peru. The population in 2005 was 13479.

References